Hatayspor women's football is a Turkish women's football team as part of Hatayspor based in Antakya of Hatay. They were founded in 2021. Called also as Atakaş Hatayspor, the club is sponsored by the local steel production  and port management corporate group Atakaş.

History 
The Turkish Football Federation appealed to the major clubs of the men's top-level league of Süper Lig clubs to form their women's football sides in order to help improve the women's football in Turkey. Hatayspor women's football were established as part of the 1967-founded club in 2021. They were approved as one of the eight newly established teams to play in the restructured league of Turkish Women's Super League.

Club footballer Verda Demetgül (born 2008), died under the rubble of her apartment devastated by the earthquake in Turkey that occurred on 6 February 2023.

Stadium 
ThThe team play their home matches at Defne Atatürk Stadium located in Defne district of Hatay Province.

In the 2022–23 Super League season, the team played their home matches at stadiums in different districts of Hatay Province such as Hassa Stadium in Hassa, Karaağaç Sports Complex in Arsuz, Kırıkhan City Stadium in Kırıkhan, Reyhanlı Tayfur Sökmen Stadium in Reyhanlı, and New Hatay Stadium in Antakya.

Statistics 

(1) : Finishe Group A as 10th, remained in the league after playouts
(2) : Season in progress

Current squad 

Head coach:  Hilmi Bugüner

Kit history

References 

Women's football
Women's football clubs in Turkey
Association football clubs established in 2021
Sport in Antakya
2021 establishments in Turkey